Piotr Stefan Wandycz (September 20, 1923 – July 29, 2017) was a Polish-American historian. He was also the President of the Polish Institute of Arts and Sciences of America, and professor emeritus at Yale University, specializing in Eastern and Central European history.

Life
He was born in Kraków in 1923 during the Second Polish Republic to Damian and Stefania (Dunikowska) Wandycz and raised in Lwow. Wandycz left the country during World War II on September 17, 1939, when the Soviet army invaded eastern Poland. He and his family crossed into Romania, and in 1940 went to France. Graduating from the Polish Lycee in Villard de Lans, he studied at the University of Grenoble (1941–42). In late 1942 he reached the United Kingdom where he served in the Polish army until 1945 as a second lieutenant. After the war he studied at the University of Cambridge where he received B.A. and M.A. and the London School of Economics (Ph.D. 1951). Later he moved to the United States, where he taught at Indiana University before coming to Yale University in 1966 as an associate professor. He was promoted to a full professorship in 1968 and was named Bradford Durfee Professor in 1989. At Yale, he served as director of graduate studies in Russian and East European studies and in history, the chair of the Council on Russian and East European Studies, and the director of the Language and Area Center. He authored 18 books and over 400 articles and book reviews.

Piotr S. Wandycz was a member of the Polish Academy of Sciences, the Polish Institute of Arts and Sciences of America, the Polish Academy of Learning, and an honorary member of the Polish Historical Association. His many other honors included the Commander's Cross of the Order of Polonia Restituta and honorary degrees from the University of Wrocław, the Sorbonne, the Jagiellonian University, and the Catholic University of Lublin. He died on July 29, 2017.

Works 
Piotr Wandycz was a noted authority on Eastern and Central European history. His many books include France and Her Eastern Allies, 1919-1925, which won the 1962 American Historical Association's George Louis Beer Prize; The Twilight of French Eastern Alliances, 1926-1936, which received the Wayne S. Vucinich Prize of the American Association for the Advancement of Slavic Studies; and The Price of Freedom: A History of East Central Europe from the Middle Ages to the Present, which was a 1992 History Book Club selection.

See also
List of Poles

References

Further reading
 M.B.B. Biskupski (Co-authored with Neal Pease and Anna Cienciala), "Piotr S. Wandycz - pionier badań w Ameryce nad dziejami Polski i Europy Środkowo-Wschodniej" ("Piotr S. Wandycz: A Pioneer in Research in America Concerning Poland and East Central Europe"), in Studia z Dziejow Rosji i Europy srodkowo-wschodniej, 30 (1995), pp. 5–13.

External links
 Piotr S. Wandycz homepage at Yale
 President of PIASA, Prof. Piotr S. Wandycz, Received High Honors in Poland

1923 births
2017 deaths
20th-century Polish historians
Polish male non-fiction writers
Polish emigrants to the United States
Alumni of the London School of Economics
Commanders of the Order of Polonia Restituta
Alumni of the University of Cambridge
Grenoble Alpes University alumni
Historians of Polish Americans
Polish expatriates in France
Polish expatriates in the United Kingdom
People associated with the magazine "Kultura"
Writers from Kraków